Orconectes packardi, the Appalachian cave crayfish, is a species of crayfish in the family Cambaridae. It is endemic to Kentucky, where it is found in 16 caves in four southeastern counties in the Cumberland River basin.

Formerly a subspecies of O. australis, it was raised to species status by Buhay and Crandall in 2008.

References

Cambaridae
Fauna of the United States
Endemic fauna of Kentucky
Freshwater crustaceans of North America
Crustaceans described in 1944
Cave crayfish